Maxette Grisoni-Pirbakas (born 14 April 1975) is a French politician, who is a Member of the European Parliament since 2019.

Biography 
She is the leader of the Fédération nationale des syndicats d'exploitants agricoles in Guadeloupe.

She has served in the European Parliament for the National Rally (RN) since 2019. She was her party's candidate in the 2021 French regional elections in Guadeloupe. 

She defected to the Reconquête party in February 2022, endorsing Éric Zemmour in the presidential election.

References 

Living people
1973 births
National Rally (France) politicians
French trade unionists
French women trade unionists
People from Les Abymes
Black French politicians
French people of Guadeloupean descent
MEPs for France 2019–2024
21st-century French women politicians
Reconquête politicians